Peter Anthony Lawrence  (born 23 June 1941) is a British developmental biologist at the Laboratory of Molecular Biology and the Zoology Department of the University of Cambridge. He was a staff scientist of the Medical Research Council from 1969 to 2006.

Education
Lawrence was educated at Wennington School in Wetherby, and then at St Catharine's College, Cambridge on a Harkness Fellowship; he gained his doctorate as a student of Vincent Wigglesworth for work on Oncopeltus fasciatus (milkweed bug)

Career and research
Lawrence's main discoveries lie in trying to understand what type of information is required to shape an animal and generate a pattern (such as on a butterfly wing or a fingerprint). He is the principal advocate of the idea that cells in a gradient of a morphogen develop according to their local concentration of the morphogen and that this mechanism is used to generate patterns of cells. Together with Ginés Morata, he has helped establish the compartment theory first proposed by Antonio Garcia-Bellido. In this hypothesis, a set of cells collectively builds a territory (or "compartment"), and only that territory, in the animal. As development proceeds, a "selector gene" switches on in a subset of this clone of cells, and the clone becomes divided into two sets of cells that construct two adjacent compartments. Much of the evidence for the theory comes from studies on the Drosophila fly wing.

For the last twenty years he has been working, in collaboration with Gary Struhl on the development of the adult abdomen of Drosophila, with the aim of understanding the design and construction of the epidermal patterns, particularly planar polarity and cell affinity. His research has been funded by the MRC and the Wellcome Trust.

Publications
Lawrence wrote The Making of a Fly in 1992, which explains how the body plans of flies and higher animals, like humans, are constructed. The book received "further" recognition in April 2011 when fellow biologist Michael Eisen discovered two booksellers were programatically setting increasingly higher prices for copies of the book on Amazon.com's used book market. European Commissioner Margrethe Vestager mentioned this event as an early example of algorithmic tacit collusion on March 16, 2017. The sellers eventually priced copies over $23 million before the feedback loop was broken.

Lawrence has also written commentaries on the ethics of science practice, and collaborated with Mark Bretscher on the obituary of Francis Crick published in Current Biology.

Awards and honours
Lawrence was awarded membership of the European Molecular Biology Organization (EMBO). He was elected a Fellow of the Royal Society in 1983, awarded the Darwin Medal, and was a recipient of the Prince of Asturias Prize for scientific research. He was elected a Foreign member of the Royal Swedish Academy of Sciences in 2000.

Personal life
Lawrence married Birgitta Haraldson in 1971, a clinical psychologist and expert on autism.

References

1941 births
Living people
Members of the European Molecular Biology Organization
British zoologists
Alumni of St Catharine's College, Cambridge
Fellows of the Royal Society
Members of the Royal Swedish Academy of Sciences